Events in the year 2023 in Nepal.

Incumbents 
 President: Bidhya Devi Bhandari
 Vice President: Nanda Kishor Pun
 Prime Minister: Pushpa Kamal Dahal 
 Chief Justice:  Vacant
 Speaker of House of Representatives: Dev Raj Ghimire (since January 19)
 Chairman of National Assembly: Ganesh Prasad Timilsina

Events 
 1 January – Pokhara International Airport officially begins operations.
 15 January – Yeti Airlines Flight 691: All 72 people on board are killed when a plane crashes in Pokhara, Gandaki Province, where it had intended to land at Pokhara International Airport. The plane had departed from Tribhuvan International Airport in Kathmandu.
 24 January – At least one person is killed and one other is injured by an 5.9 magnitude earthquake in Bajura and Bajhang Districts.
9 March – Scheduled date for the 2023 Nepalese presidential election.

Sport
 February (scheduled) – 2023 Nepal Tri-Nation Series (cricket)
 3 March – Scheduled startup of the 2023 Martyr's Memorial A-Division League.

Deaths

References 

 
Nepal
Nepal
2020s in Nepal
Years of the 21st century in Nepal